Order theory is a branch of mathematics that studies various kinds of objects (often binary relations) that capture the intuitive notion of ordering, providing a framework for saying when one thing is "less than" or "precedes" another.

An alphabetical list of many notions of order theory can be found in the order theory glossary. See also inequality, extreme value and mathematical optimization.

Overview
Partially ordered set
Preorder
Totally ordered set
Total preorder
Chain
Trichotomy
Extended real number line
Antichain
Strict order
Hasse diagram
Directed acyclic graph
Duality (order theory)
Product order

Distinguished elements of partial orders

Greatest element (maximum, top, unit), Least element (minimum, bottom, zero)
Maximal element, minimal element
Upper bound
Least upper bound (supremum, join)
Greatest lower bound (infimum, meet)
Limit superior and limit inferior
Irreducible element
Prime element
Compact element

Subsets of partial orders

Cofinal and coinitial set, sometimes also called dense
Meet-dense set and join-dense set
Linked set (upwards and downwards)
Directed set (upwards and downwards)
centered and σ-centered set
Net (mathematics)
Upper set and lower set
Ideal and filter
Ultrafilter

Special types of partial orders

Completeness (order theory)
Dense order
Distributivity (order theory)
modular lattice
distributive lattice
completely distributive lattice
Ascending chain condition
Infinite descending chain
Countable chain condition, often abbreviated as ccc
Knaster's condition, sometimes denoted property (K)

Well-orders 
Well-founded relation
Ordinal number
Well-quasi-ordering

Completeness properties
 Semilattice
 Lattice
 (Directed) complete partial order, (d)cpo
 Bounded complete
 Complete lattice
Knaster–Tarski theorem
 Infinite divisibility

Orders with further algebraic operations
Heyting algebra
Relatively complemented lattice
Complete Heyting algebra
Pointless topology
MV-algebra
Ockham algebras:
Stone algebra
De Morgan algebra
Kleene algebra (with involution)
Łukasiewicz–Moisil algebra
Boolean algebra (structure)
Boolean ring
Complete Boolean algebra
Orthocomplemented lattice
Quantale

Orders in algebra
Partially ordered monoid
Ordered group
Archimedean property
Ordered ring
Ordered field
Artinian ring
Noetherian
Linearly ordered group
Monomial order
Weak order of permutations
Bruhat order on a Coxeter group
Incidence algebra

Functions between partial orders
Monotonic
Pointwise order of functions
Galois connection
Order embedding
Order isomorphism
Closure operator
Functions that preserve suprema/infima

Completions and free constructions
Dedekind completion
Ideal completion

Domain theory

Way-below relation
Continuous poset
Continuous lattice
Algebraic poset
Scott domain
Algebraic lattice
Scott information system
Powerdomain
Scott topology
Scott continuity

Orders in mathematical logic
Lindenbaum algebra
Zorn's lemma
Hausdorff maximality theorem
Boolean prime ideal theorem
Ultrafilter
Ultrafilter lemma
Tree (set theory)
Tree (descriptive set theory)
Suslin's problem
Absorption law
Prewellordering

Orders in topology
Stone duality
Stone's representation theorem for Boolean algebras
Specialization (pre)order
Order topology of a total order (open interval topology)
Alexandrov topology
Upper topology
Scott topology
Scott continuity
Lawson topology
Finer topology

Order
 
Order theory
Order theory